Emprosthiothrips is a genus of thrips in the family Phlaeothripidae.

Species
 Emprosthiothrips bogong
 Emprosthiothrips brimblecombei
 Emprosthiothrips brittoni
 Emprosthiothrips csiro
 Emprosthiothrips epallelus
 Emprosthiothrips niger

References

Phlaeothripidae
Thrips
Thrips genera